Julia is a 2014 American neo-noir horror film and the feature film directorial debut of Matthew A. Brown. The film stars Ashley C. Williams as a woman who seeks revenge for her brutal rape. It had its world release on 19 July 2014 at the Puchon International Fantastic Film Festival.

Synopsis
Julia (Ashley C. Williams) is a young woman that was drugged and raped by Pierce (Ryan Cooper) and three friends, who then left her for dead. She manages to make her way home, where the viewer discovers that Julia has spent most of her life being abused by various tormentors and has turned to self-harm as a result. Later Julia overhears someone discussing a therapy that has rape victims taking back power from their attackers. She's introduced to  Dr. Sgundud (Jack Noseworthy) through the mysterious Sadie (Tahyna Tozzi). Under her guidance, Julia seduces a man (implied to be a rapist of one of the past patients of Sgrundud) and lures him to her apartment. Stripping naked, she seduces him and engages in sexual intercourse, but halfway through the rest of the sisterhood restrain him, make Julia castrate him (taking genitals as a trophy), impale him numerous times and dispose of the body.

After several more hunts, Julia one day sees one of her rapists, Adam, in the clinic where she works, and decides to seek revenge on them all using Sgrundud's methods. She convinces Adam to assemble a meeting (claiming that "in a way, it [what happened] was the best thing to ever happen to me") but leaving Pierce, the rapists "boss", as last. The night of the meeting, Julia drugs Adam and the other two friends who raped her, surgically removes Adam's eyes (as he did not actually rape her, only watched) and the other men's genitalia, then leaves for the last one, Pierce. However, she finds him killed and evirated by the sisterhood, while Julia herself is knocked unconscious and taken back to Dr. Sgrundud after Sadie snitches on her.

Sgrundud tells Julia that she has violated the rules of "taking medicine" and therefore, drugged again, is about to be vivisected. He also reveals that the idea of emasculating victims came to him after he himself went through such a procedure performed by his father after he discovered his son's homosexuality, as he liked to dress in his sister's clothes. However, before he starts to operate on Julia, Sadie saves her, entering the building, and kills Sgrundud's associates. The doctor confronts Sadie and points his gun at her, but Julia manages to get off the operating table and decapitates Sgrundud from behind. Before Sadie can thank her friend, Julia shoots her in the head and leaves towards an unknown future.

Cast
Ashley C. Williams as Julia
Tahyna Tozzi as Sadie
Jack Noseworthy as Dr. Sgundud
Joel de la Fuente as Dr. Lin
Cary Woodworth as Scott
Darren Lipari as Matt
Ryan Cooper as Piers
Brad Koed as Adam
Sean Kleier as Tim
Bridget Megan Clark as Yael Frankel
Chris Cardona as Macho Corp. Executive
Kumiko Konishi as Female Bartender
James Henry B. as Pig F*ucker - Man

Reception
Nerdly praised Julia, writing "Julia is an evocative and engaging watch more from its uniquely cinematic stylings than through anything given in the narrative. While certainly not perfect, overall it is a decent entry in a genre which is troubling at the best of times and I certainly will be remembering writer/director Brown’s name for the future." Grolsch Film Works also recommended the movie, comparing it favorably to American Mary. Flickering Myth gave a mixed review for Julia, commenting that the movie was "a lot better than the I Spit on Your Grave remakes and it’s a lot smarter than the original on which they were based, but it’s also fairly forgettable."

References

External links
 
 
 

2014 films
2010s English-language films
2014 horror thriller films
2014 independent films
2014 LGBT-related films
American horror thriller films
American independent films
American LGBT-related films
American rape and revenge films
Films shot in New York City
LGBT-related horror thriller films
2010s American films